The Salakanagara Kingdom is the first historically recorded Indianised kingdom in Western Java. The kingdom existed between 130-362 AD. Claudius Ptolemaeus (160 AD) wrote about Java in his book, Γεωγραφικὴ Ὑφήγησις (Geographical guidance). He mentions the lands of Chryse and Argyre (meaning: Gold and Silver) in Labadio. According to some historians, e.g. Edi S. Ekajati, Labadio means Dwipa-Javaka, Dwipa-Javaka or Java Dwipa, which is the ancient name of Java Island. At the time, the Salakanagara kingdom ruled west Java and its name means “Silver Nation” in old Javanese language. According to some theories, Ptolemaeus may have visited Java in 160 AD. A more recent source, from the 17th century, Pustaka Rajya Rajya i Bhumi Nusantara describes Salakanagara as being founded by an Indian merchant from Pallava Kingdom.

Historiography
The history of Salakanagara is quite mysterious as the historical and archaeological sources are scarce. Compared to its successor, Tarumanagara, the kingdom did not leave any local tangible historical records and relics such as inscriptions or temples ruins. The main source of Salakanagara's history was a manuscript Pustaka Rajya-rajya I Bhumi Nusantara composed in 17th century by a council led by Prince Wangsakerta of Cirebon, and a few Chinese records.

History
According to Pustaka Rajya Rajya i Bhumi Nusantara, Salakanagara was located on west coast of Java, in the present day Banten province. It was founded by Dewawarman, stylised as Prabu Dharmalokapala Dewawarman Gangga Raksagapura Sagara. Dewawarman was an Indian ambassador or trader sent from India to establish relations with Javadwipa.

According to a history record from India, the kingdom ruled Javadwipa from 130 CE to 362 CE. The founder of the kingdom was Aki Tirem. The kings of Salakanagara were:

Dewawarman I (130-168 AD)
Dewawarman II (168-195 AD)
Dewawarman III (195-238 AD)
Dewawarman IV (238-252 AD)
Dewawarman V (252-276 AD)
Mahisa Suramardini Warmandewi (276-289 AD)
Dewawarman VI (289-308 AD)
Dewawarman VII (308-340 AD)
Sphatikarnawa Warmandewi (340-348 AD)
Dewawarman VIII (348-362 AD)

Indonesian historian Edi S. Ekajati argued that Salakanagara is Argyre. a mythical island of silver in Greek and Roman mythology because Salakanagara means "country of silver" in Sanskrit.

Salakanagara was replaced by Tarumanagara.

Subordinate kingdoms
Salakanagara was in charge of small kingdoms, which were founded by people from the Dewawarman dynasty (the kings who ruled Salakanagara). Kingdoms that are subordinate to Salakanagara include:

 Ujung Kulon Kingdom
Ujung Kulon Kingdom is located in the Ujung Kulon region and was founded by Senapati Bahadura Harigana Jayasakti (Dewawarman I's younger brother). When this kingdom was led by Darma Satyanagara, the king married the daughter of Dewawarman III and later became the 4th king in the Kingdom of Salakanagara. When Tarumanagara grew into a large kingdom, Purnawarman (the third Tarumanagara king) conquered the Ujung Kulon Kingdom.  Eventually Ujung Kulon Kingdom became the subordinate kingdom of Tarumanagara.  More than that, the Ujung Kulon Royal troops also helped the troops of Wisnuwarman (the fourth king of Tarumanagara) to quell the Cakrawarman rebellion.

 Kingdom of Tanjung Kidul
The Kingdom of Tanjung Kidul has thousands of cities in Aghrabintapura (now including the South Cianjur region). This kingdom was led by Sweta Liman Sakti (Dewawarman I's second sister).

Location
There are three locations that have been approved as the center of the Salakanagara Kingdom.  They are Teluk Lada (Pandeglang, Banten), Condet (Jakarta) and Mount Salak (Bogor).

First, Rajatapura is mentioned by the Wangsakerta Manuscript as the center of the Salakanagara government, located in Lada Bay (Pandeglang, Banten). In the text, Rajatapura is called a translated city in Java. From this the eight King Dewawarman reigned and controlled trade throughout Java.

Second, Ciondet or Condet in East Jakarta, which is 30 kilometers from the port of Sunda Kelapa.  This area has a flowing river named Sungai Tiram.  The word "Oysters" supports comes from the name of Aki Tirem, in-law of Dewawarman I, founder of Salakanagara.

Third, Mount Salak (Bogor) is a mountain which is a silver-day afternoon compilation. In Sundanese, Salakanagara means Silver Kingdom. In addition, this opinion is also based on the similarity of names between Salaka and Salak.

See also

 Tarumanegara

Notes

References

 Darsa, Undang A. 2004. “Kropak 406; Carita Parahyangan dan Fragmen Carita Parahyangan“, Makalah disampaikan dalam Kegiatan Bedah Naskah Kuna yang diselenggarakan oleh Balai Pengelolaan Museum Negeri Sri Baduga. Bandung-Jatinangor: Fakultas Sastra Universitas Padjadjaran: hlm. 1 – 23.
 Ekadjati, Edi S. 1995. Sunda, Nusantara, dan Indonesia; Suatu Tinjauan Sejarah. Pidato Pengukuhan Jabatan Guru Besar dalam Ilmu Sejarah Fakultas Sastra Universitas Padjadjaran pada Hari Sabtu, 16 December `1995. Bandung: Universitas Padjadjaran.
 Ekadjati, Edi S. 1981. Historiografi Priangan. Bandung: Lembaga Kebudayaan Universitas Padjadjaran.
 Ekadjati, Edi S. (Koordinator). 1993. Sejarah Pemerintahan di Jawa Barat. Bandung: Pemerintah Provinsi Daerah Tingkat I Jawa Barat.
 Raffles, Thomas Stamford. 1817. The History of Java, 2 vol. London: Block Parbury and Allen and John Murry.
 Raffles, Thomas Stamford. 2008. The History of Java (Terjemahan Eko Prasetaningrum, Nuryati Agustin, dan Idda Qoryati Mahbubah). Yogyakarta: Narasi.
 Z., Mumuh Muhsin. Sunda, Priangan, dan Jawa Barat. Makalah disampaikan dalam Diskusi Hari Jadi Jawa Barat, diselenggarakan oleh Harian Umum Pikiran Rakyat Bekerja Sama dengan Dinas Pariwisata dan Kebudayaan Jawa Barat pada Selasa, 3 November 2009 di Aula Redaksi HU Pikiran Rakyat.
 Uka Tjandrasasmita. (2009).  Arkeologi Islam Nusantara. Kepustakaan Populer Gramedia.
 E. Rokajat Asura. (September 2011). Harisbaya bersuami 2 raja - Kemelut cinta di antara dua kerajaan Sumedang Larang dan Cirebon. Penerbit Edelweiss.
 Atja, Drs. (1970). Ratu Pakuan. Lembaga Bahasa dan Sedjarah Unpad. Bandung.
 Atmamihardja, Mamun, Drs. Raden. (1958). Sadjarah Sunda. Bandung. Ganaco Nv. 
 Joedawikarta (1933). Sadjarah Soekapoera, Parakan Moencang sareng Gadjah. Pengharepan. Bandoeng, 
 Lubis, Nina Herlina., Dr. MSi, dkk. (2003). Sejarah Tatar Sunda jilid I dan II. CV. Satya Historica. Bandung. 
 Herman Soemantri Emuch. (1979). Sajarah Sukapura, sebuah telaah filologis. Universitas Indonesia. Jakarta. 
 Zamhir, Drs. (1996). Mengenal Museum Prabu Geusan Ulun serta Riwayat Leluhur Sumedang. Yayasan Pangeran Sumedang. Sumedang. 
 Sukardja, Djadja. (2003). Kanjeng Prebu R.A.A. Kusumadiningrat Bupati Galuh Ciamis th. 1839 s / d 1886. Sanggar SGB. Ciamis. 
 Sulendraningrat P.S. (1975). Sejarah Cirebon dan Silsilah Sunan Gunung Jati Maulana Syarif Hidayatullah. Lembaga Kebudayaan Wilayah III Cirebon. Cirebon.
 Sunardjo, Unang, R. H., Drs. (1983). Kerajaan Carbon 1479-1809. PT. Tarsito. Bandung. 
 Suparman, Tjetje, R. H., (1981). Sajarah Sukapura. Bandung 
 Surianingrat, Bayu., Drs. (1983). Sajarah Kabupatian I Bhumi Sumedang 1550-1950. CV.Rapico. Bandung. 
 Soekardi, Yuliadi. (2004). Kian Santang. CV Pustaka Setia. 
 Soekardi, Yuliadi. (2004). Prabu Siliwangi. CV Pustaka Setia. 
 Tjangker Soedradjat, Ade. (1996). Silsilah Wargi Pangeran Sumedang Turunan Pangeran Santri alias Pangeran Koesoemadinata I Penguasa Sumedang Larang 1530-1578. Yayasan Pangeran Sumedang. Sumedang. 
 Widjajakusuma, Djenal Asikin., Raden Dr. (1960). Babad Pasundan, Riwajat Kamerdikaan Bangsa Sunda Saruntagna Karadjaan Pdjadjaran Dina Taun 1580. Kujang. Bandung. 
 Winarno, F. G. (1990). Bogor Hari Esok Masa Lampau. PT. Bina Hati. Bogor. 
 Olthof, W.L. (cetakan IV 2008). Babad Tanah Jawi - mulai dari Nabi Adam sampai tahun 1647. PT. Buku Kita. Yogyakarta Bagikan.
 A. Sobana Hardjasaputra, H.D. Bastaman, Edi S. Ekadjati, Ajip Rosidi, Wim van Zanten, Undang A. Darsa. (2004). Bupati di Priangan dan Kajian Lainnya Mengenai Budaya Sunda. Pusat Studi Sunda.
 A. Sobana Hardjasaputra (Ed.). (2008).	Sejarah Purwakarta.
 Nina H. Lubis, Kunto Sofianto, Taufik Abdullah (pengantar), Ietje Marlina, A. Sobana Hardjasaputra, Reiza D. Dienaputra, Mumuh Muhsin Z. (2000). Sejarah Kota-kota Lama di di Jawa Barat. Alqaprint. .
 

History of Indonesia
History of West Java
Precolonial states of Indonesia
West Java
Sundanese culture